Satish Bahadur (26 November 1925 – 23 July 2010), was an Indian film critic who served as Professor of Film Appreciation (1963–83) at the Film and Television Institute of India, Pune, India, and a close associate of Marie Seton, Vijaya Mulay and PK Nair.

Until his death in Pune, Satish continued to be actively involved with film appreciation and teaching of cinema. According to the obituary in The Indian Express, he was "...one of the founding teachers of the FTII, he played a crucial role in shaping the policies and vision of the Institute. Even today, he is held in high esteem by his students, some of whom are luminaries of the Indian cinema. Arun Khopkar, filmmaker and student of Bahadur, was quoted as saying, '"...from day one, he became the guiding light in my life. Like a music teacher who explains the intricacies of taal and laya to his students, he would unveil countless aspects of films for us. Unlike many teachers who overshadow their students, he had the knack to bring the best out of his students. In fact, he was the one who started the concept of film diary amongst FTII students. I have this habit of calling the old, good and late faculty of the institute, the ghost faculty. Now, he belongs to that and sitting up there, he will continue to guide his students".

Early life and education
Born in Moradabad, he studied at the University of Agra and the Allahabad University in the state of Uttar Pradesh. He was married to Vinodini Bahadur (1928–2016). The couple had a daughter Nandini and a son Apurva (named for the protagonist of Apur Sansar).

Career

1951–1963
Taught Economics to postgraduate students at DAV College, Kanpur and University Institute of Social Sciences, Agra.

1958–1963
Promotional work in the emerging film society movement in India.  
Organized Agra Film Society for citizens, and Agra University Film Society for the campus.
Founder member of the Federation of the Film Societies in India.
Editorial committee of  Indian Film Culture.
Research work on Indian components of the International Sociological Association project on Study of the Film Hero in seventeen different cultures.

1963–1983
Professor of Film Appreciation, Film and TV Institute of India, Pune.

1968–2003
Worked with the one-month-long summer extension program in Film Appreciation at Pune. The summer course, 2006 was the 31st in this series.

1968–2002
Taught numerous short duration courses in Film Appreciation (ranging from three days to ten days) at various cultural and educational organizations in India and also in Bangladesh..

Publications

1967–2003:

Numerous papers on different aspects of the film studies. Of special value are the following:
Some aspects of Phalke (Phalke Centenary Volume 1971).
Screen Education at university levels in India (European Center of Education, 1966)
Aesthetics: from traditional iconography to contemporary kitsch in the Indian Cinema Superbazar. Edited by Aruna Vasudev and Philip Langlet (1980).
Aesthetic Ideas and the film medium in Sandhan 2003, due to be included in the forthcoming Aesthetic Theories in Indian Tradition (Edited by D.P. Chattopadhaya, Kapila Vatsyayan and S.S. Deshpande).

He worked on several film and television programs explaining the basic concepts of Film Appreciation. Of special interest are the following:
Batein Filmo Ki: Hindi, 14 parts serial for Doordarshan (1983–1984).
Understanding Cinema: English, 6 hours 30 minutes, serial in 15 parts for the Consortium for Educational Communications (1985–1986).
Samajh Cinema Ki: Hindi, 5-hour serial in 12 parts for the Consortium of Educational Communications (1986–1987).

During 2006, the Asian Film Foundation, Mumbai presented the Satyajit Ray Memorial Award 
to Satish Bahadur for "Promoting Film as Art."

Educators from Uttar Pradesh
1925 births
2010 deaths
People from Moradabad
University of Allahabad alumni
Film educators
Indian film critics
Indian film historians